Arabic (or ) is a Semitic language spoken primarily across the Arab world. Having emerged in the 1st century, it is named after the Arab people; the term "Arab" was initially used to describe those living in the Arabian Peninsula, as perceived by geographers from ancient Greece.

Since the 7th century, Arabic has been characterized by diglossia, with an opposition between a standard prestige language—i.e., Literary Arabic: Modern Standard Arabic (MSA) or Classical Arabic—and diverse vernacular varieties, which serve as mother tongues. Colloquial dialects vary significantly from MSA, impeding mutual intelligibility. MSA is only acquired through formal education and is not spoken natively. It is the language of literature, official documents, and formal written media. In spoken form, MSA is used in formal contexts, news bulletins and for prayers. This variety is the lingua franca of the Arab world and the liturgical language of Islam. It is an official language of 26 states and 1 disputed territory, the third most after English and French. It is also one of six official languages of the United Nations.

Spoken varieties are the usual medium of communication in all other domains. They are not standardized and vary significantly, some of them being mutually unintelligible. The International Organization for Standardization assigns language codes to 33 varieties of Arabic, including MSA. Arabic vernaculars do not descend from MSA or Classical Arabic. Combined, Arabic dialects have 362 million native speakers, while MSA is spoken by 274 million L2 speakers, making it the sixth most spoken language in the world.

Arabic is traditionally written with the Arabic alphabet, a right-to-left abjad. This alphabet is the official script for MSA. Colloquial varieties were traditionally not written; however, with the emergence of social media, the amount of written dialects has significantly increased online. Besides the Arabic alphabet, dialects are also often written in Latin from left to right or in Hebrew characters (in Israel) with no standardized orthography. Maltese and Hassaniya are the only varieties officially written in a Latin alphabet.

Classification 

Arabic is usually classified as a Central Semitic language. Linguists still differ as to the best classification of Semitic language sub-groups. The Semitic languages changed significantly between Proto-Semitic and the emergence of Central Semitic languages, particularly in grammar. Innovations of the Central Semitic languages—all maintained in Arabic—include:
 The conversion of the suffix-conjugated stative formation (jalas-) into a past tense.
 The conversion of the prefix-conjugated preterite-tense formation (yajlis-) into a present tense.
 The elimination of other prefix-conjugated mood/aspect forms (e.g., a present tense formed by doubling the middle root, a perfect formed by infixing a  after the first root consonant, probably a jussive formed by a stress shift) in favor of new moods formed by endings attached to the prefix-conjugation forms (e.g., -u for indicative, -a for subjunctive, no ending for jussive, -an or -anna for energetic).
 The development of an internal passive.
There are several features which Classical Arabic, the modern Arabic varieties, as well as the Safaitic and Hismaic inscriptions share which are unattested in any other Central Semitic language variety, including the Dadanitic and Taymanitic languages of the northern Hejaz. These features are evidence of common descent from a hypothetical ancestor, Proto-Arabic. The following features can be reconstructed with confidence for Proto-Arabic:
 negative particles  * ;  * to Classical Arabic 
  G-passive participle
 a subjunctive in -
 -demonstratives
 leveling of the - allomorph of the feminine ending
  complementizer and subordinator
 the use of - to introduce modal clauses
 independent object pronoun in 
 vestiges of nunation
On the other hand, several Arabic varieties are closer to other Semitic languages and maintain features not found in Classical Arabic, indicating that these varieties cannot have developed from Classical Arabic. Thus, Arabic vernaculars do not descend from Classical Arabic: Classical Arabic is a sister language rather than their direct ancestor.

History

Old Arabic 

Arabia boasted a wide variety of Semitic languages in antiquity. In the southwest, various Central Semitic languages both belonging to and outside of the Ancient South Arabian family (e.g. Southern Thamudic) were spoken. It is also believed that the ancestors of the Modern South Arabian languages (non-Central Semitic languages) were also spoken in southern Arabia at this time. To the north, in the oases of northern Hejaz, Dadanitic and Taymanitic held some prestige as inscriptional languages. In  and parts of western Arabia, a language known to scholars as Thamudic C is attested. In eastern Arabia, inscriptions in a script derived from ASA attest to a language known as Hasaitic. Finally, on the northwestern frontier of Arabia, various languages known to scholars as Thamudic B, Thamudic D, Safaitic, and Hismaic are attested. The last two share important isoglosses with later forms of Arabic, leading scholars to theorize that Safaitic and Hismaic are in fact early forms of Arabic and that they should be considered Old Arabic.

Linguists generally believe that "Old Arabic" (a collection of related dialects that constitute the precursor of Arabic) first emerged around the 1st century CE. However, this inscription does not participate in several of the key innovations of the Arabic language group, such as the conversion of Semitic mimation to nunation in the singular. It is best reassessed as a separate language on the Central Semitic dialect continuum.
It was also thought that Old Arabic coexisted alongside—and then gradually displaced--epigraphic Ancient North Arabian (ANA), which was theorized to have been the regional tongue for many centuries. ANA, despite its name, was considered a very distinct language, and mutually unintelligible, from "Arabic". Scholars named its variant dialects after the towns where the inscriptions were discovered (Dadanitic, Taymanitic, Hismaic, Safaitic). However, most arguments for a single ANA language or language family were based on the shape of the definite article, a prefixed h-. It has been argued that the h- is an archaism and not a shared innovation, and thus unsuitable for language classification, rendering the hypothesis of an ANA language family untenable. Safaitic and Hismaic, previously considered ANA, should be considered Old Arabic due to the fact that they participate in the innovations common to all forms of Arabic.The earliest attestation of continuous Arabic text in an ancestor of the modern Arabic script are three lines of poetry by a man named Garm(')allāhe found in En Avdat, Israel, and dated to around 125 CE. This is followed by the Namara inscription, an epitaph of the  king Imru' al-Qays bar 'Amro, dating to 328 CE, found at Namaraa, Syria. From the 4th to the 6th centuries, the Nabataean script evolves into the Arabic script recognizable from the early Islamic era. There are inscriptions in an undotted, 17-letter Arabic script dating to the 6th century CE, found at four locations in Syria (Zabad, Jabal 'Usays). The oldest surviving papyrus in Arabic dates to 643 CE, and it uses dots to produce the modern 28-letter Arabic alphabet. The language of that papyrus and of the Qur'an are referred to by linguists as "Quranic Arabic", as distinct from its codification soon thereafter into "Classical Arabic".

Old Hejazi and Classical Arabic

In late pre-Islamic times, a transdialectal and transcommunal variety of Arabic emerged in the Hejaz, which continued living its parallel life after literary Arabic had been institutionally standardized in the 2nd and 3rd century of the Hijra, most strongly in Judeo-Christian texts, keeping alive ancient features eliminated from the "learned" tradition (Classical Arabic). This variety and both its classicizing and "lay" iterations have been termed Middle Arabic in the past, but they are thought to continue an Old Higazi register. It is clear that the orthography of the Qur'an was not developed for the standardized form of Classical Arabic; rather, it shows the attempt on the part of writers to record an archaic form of Old Higazi.

In the late 6th century AD, a relatively uniform intertribal "poetic koine" distinct from the spoken vernaculars developed based on the Bedouin dialects of Najd, probably in connection with the court of al-Ḥīra. During the first Islamic century, the majority of Arabic poets and Arabic-writing persons spoke Arabic as their mother tongue. Their texts, although mainly preserved in far later manuscripts, contain traces of non-standardized Classical Arabic elements in morphology and syntax.

Standardization 

Abu al-Aswad al-Du'ali (–689) is credited with standardizing Arabic grammar, or an-naḥw ( "the way"), and pioneering a system of diacritics to differentiate consonants ( nuqat l-i'jām "pointing for non-Arabs") and indicate vocalization ( at-tashkil). Al-Khalil ibn Ahmad al-Farahidi (718 – 786) compiled the first Arabic dictionary, Kitāb al-'Ayn ( "The Book of the Letter ع"), and is credited with establishing the rules of Arabic prosody. Al-Jahiz (776-868) proposed to Al-Akhfash al-Akbar an overhaul of the grammar of Arabic, but it would not come to pass for two centuries. The standardization of Arabic reached completion around the end of the 8th century. The first comprehensive description of the ʿarabiyya "Arabic", Sībawayhi's al-Kitāb, is based first of all upon a corpus of poetic texts, in addition to Qur'an usage and Bedouin informants whom he considered to be reliable speakers of the ʿarabiyya.

Spread 
Arabic spread with the spread of Islam. Following the early Muslim conquests, Arabic gained vocabulary from Middle Persian and Turkish. In the early Abbasid period, many Classical Greek terms entered Arabic through translations carried out at Baghdad's House of Wisdom.

By the 8th century, knowledge of Classical Arabic had become an essential prerequisite for rising into the higher classes throughout the Islamic world, both for Muslims and non-Muslims. For example, Maimonides, the Andalusi Jewish philosopher, authored works in Judeo-Arabic—Arabic written in Hebrew script—including his famous The Guide for the Perplexed (Dalālat al-ḥāʾirīn).

Development 

Ibn Mada' of Cordoba (1116–1196) realized the overhaul of Arabic grammar first proposed by Al-Jahiz 200 years prior.

The Maghrebi lexicographer Ibn Manzur compiled Lisān al-ʿArab ("Tongue of Arabs"), a major reference dictionary of Arabic, in 1290.

Neo-Arabic 
Charles Ferguson's koine theory claims that the modern Arabic dialects collectively descend from a single military koine that sprang up during the Islamic conquests; this view has been challenged in recent times. Ahmad al-Jallad proposes that there were at least two considerably distinct types of Arabic on the eve of the conquests: Northern and Central (Al-Jallad 2009). The modern dialects emerged from a new contact situation produced following the conquests. Instead of the emergence of a single or multiple koines, the dialects contain several sedimentary layers of borrowed and areal features, which they absorbed at different points in their linguistic histories. According to Veersteegh and Bickerton, colloquial Arabic dialects arose from pidginized Arabic formed from contact between Arabs and conquered peoples. Pidginization and subsequent creolization among Arabs and arabized peoples could explain relative morphological and phonological simplicity of vernacular Arabic compared to Classical and MSA.

In around the 11th and 12th centuries in al-Andalus, the zajal and muwashah poetry forms developed in the dialectical Arabic of Cordoba and the Maghreb.

Nahda 

The Nahda was a cultural and especially literary renaissance of the 19th century in which writers sought "to fuse Arabic and European forms of expression." According to James L. Gelvin, "Nahda writers attempted to simplify the Arabic language and script so that it might be accessible to a wider audience."In the wake of the industrial revolution and European hegemony and colonialism, pioneering Arabic presses, such as the Amiri Press established by Muhammad Ali (1819), dramatically changed the diffusion and consumption of Arabic literature and publications. In response, a number of Arabic academies modeled after the Académie française were established with the aim of developing standardized additions to the Arabic lexicon to suit these transformations, first in Damascus (1919), then in Cairo (1932), Baghdad (1948), Rabat (1960), Amman (1977),  (1993), and Tunis (1993). They review language development, monitor new words and approve inclusion of new words into their published standard dictionaries. They also publish old and historical Arabic manuscripts. In 1997, a bureau of Arabization standardization was added to the Educational, Cultural, and Scientific Organization of the Arab League. These academies and organizations have worked toward the Arabization of the sciences, creating terms in Arabic to describe new concepts, toward the standardization of these new terms throughout the Arabic-speaking world, and toward the development of Arabic as a world language. This gave rise to what Western scholars call Modern Standard Arabic. From the 1950s, Arabization became a postcolonial nationalist policy in countries such as Tunisia, Algeria, Morocco, and Sudan.

Classical, Modern Standard and spoken Arabic 

Arabic usually refers to Standard Arabic, which Western linguists divide into Classical Arabic and Modern Standard Arabic. It could also refer to any of a variety of regional vernacular Arabic dialects, which are not necessarily mutually intelligible.

Classical Arabic is the language found in the Quran, used from the period of Pre-Islamic Arabia to that of the Abbasid Caliphate. Classical Arabic is prescriptive, according to the syntactic and grammatical norms laid down by classical grammarians (such as Sibawayh) and the vocabulary defined in classical dictionaries (such as the Lisān al-ʻArab).

Modern Standard Arabic (MSA) largely follows the grammatical standards of Classical Arabic and uses much of the same vocabulary. However, it has discarded some grammatical constructions and vocabulary that no longer have any counterpart in the spoken varieties and has adopted certain new constructions and vocabulary from the spoken varieties. Much of the new vocabulary is used to denote concepts that have arisen in the industrial and post-industrial era, especially in modern times. Due to its grounding in Classical Arabic, Modern Standard Arabic is removed over a millennium from everyday speech, which is construed as a multitude of dialects of this language. These dialects and Modern Standard Arabic are described by some scholars as not mutually comprehensible. The former are usually acquired in families, while the latter is taught in formal education settings. However, there have been studies reporting some degree of comprehension of stories told in the standard variety among preschool-aged children. The relation between Modern Standard Arabic and these dialects is sometimes compared to that of Classical Latin and Vulgar Latin vernaculars (which became Romance languages) in medieval and early modern Europe.
MSA is the variety used in most current, printed Arabic publications, spoken by some of the Arabic media across North Africa and the Middle East, and understood by most educated Arabic speakers. "Literary Arabic" and "Standard Arabic" are less strictly defined terms that may refer to Modern Standard Arabic or Classical Arabic.

Some of the differences between Classical Arabic (CA) and Modern Standard Arabic (MSA) are as follows:
 Certain grammatical constructions of CA that have no counterpart in any modern vernacular dialect (e.g., the energetic mood) are almost never used in Modern Standard Arabic.
 Case distinctions are very rare in Arabic vernaculars. As a result, MSA is generally composed without case distinctions in mind, and the proper cases are added after the fact, when necessary. Because most case endings are noted using final short vowels, which are normally left unwritten in the Arabic script, it is unnecessary to determine the proper case of most words. The practical result of this is that MSA, like English and Standard Chinese, is written in a strongly determined word order and alternative orders that were used in CA for emphasis are rare. In addition, because of the lack of case marking in the spoken varieties, most speakers cannot consistently use the correct endings in extemporaneous speech. As a result, spoken MSA tends to drop or regularize the endings except when reading from a prepared text.
The numeral system in CA is complex and heavily tied in with the case system. This system is never used in MSA, even in the most formal of circumstances; instead, a significantly simplified system is used, approximating the system of the conservative spoken varieties.

MSA uses much Classical vocabulary (e.g.,  'to go') that is not present in the spoken varieties, but deletes Classical words that sound obsolete in MSA. In addition, MSA has borrowed or coined many terms for concepts that did not exist in Quranic times, and MSA continues to evolve. Some words have been borrowed from other languages—notice that transliteration mainly indicates spelling and not real pronunciation (e.g.,   'film' or   'democracy').

However, the current preference is to avoid direct borrowings, preferring to either use loan translations (e.g.,   'branch', also used for the branch of a company or organization;   'wing', is also used for the wing of an airplane, building, air force, etc.), or to coin new words using forms within existing roots (  'apoptosis', using the root  m/w/t 'death' put into the Xth form, or   'university', based on   'to gather, unite';   'republic', based on   'multitude'). An earlier tendency was to redefine an older word although this has fallen into disuse (e.g.,   'telephone' < 'invisible caller (in Sufism)';   'newspaper' < 'palm-leaf stalk').

Colloquial or dialectal Arabic refers to the many national or regional varieties which constitute the everyday spoken language. Colloquial Arabic has many regional variants; geographically distant varieties usually differ enough to be mutually unintelligible, and some linguists consider them distinct languages. However, research indicates a high degree of mutual intelligibility between closely related Arabic variants for native speakers listening to words, sentences, and texts; and between more distantly related dialects in interactional situations.

The varieties are typically unwritten. They are often used in informal spoken media, such as soap operas and talk shows, as well as occasionally in certain forms of written media such as poetry and printed advertising.

Hassaniya Arabic and Maltese are only varieties of modern Arabic to have acquired official status. The Senegalese government adopted the Latin script to write Hassaniya Maltese is spoken in (predominantly Catholic) Malta and written with the Latin script. Linguists agree that it is a variety of spoken Arabic, descended from Siculo-Arabic, though it has experienced extensive changes as a result of sustained and intensive contact with Italo-Romance varieties, and more recently also with English. Due to "a mix of social, cultural, historical, political, and indeed linguistic factors," many Maltese people today consider their language Semitic but not a type of Arabic.

Even during Muhammad's lifetime, there were dialects of spoken Arabic. Muhammad spoke in the dialect of Mecca, in the western Arabian peninsula, and it was in this dialect that the Quran was written. However, the dialects of the eastern Arabian peninsula were considered the most prestigious at the time, so the language of the Quran was ultimately converted to follow the eastern phonology. It is this phonology that underlies the modern pronunciation of Classical Arabic.

Status and usage

Diglossia 
The sociolinguistic situation of Arabic in modern times provides a prime example of the linguistic phenomenon of diglossia, which is the normal use of two separate varieties of the same language, usually in different social situations. Tawleed is the process of giving a new shade of meaning to an old classical word. For example, al-hatif lexicographically, means the one whose sound is heard but whose person remains unseen. Now the term al-hatif is used for a telephone. Therefore, the process of tawleed can express the needs of modern civilization in a manner that would appear to be originally Arabic. In the case of Arabic, educated Arabs of any nationality can be assumed to speak both their school-taught Standard Arabic as well as their native dialects, which depending on the region may be mutually unintelligible. Some of these dialects can be considered to constitute separate languages which may have "sub-dialects" of their own. When educated Arabs of different dialects engage in conversation (for example, a Moroccan speaking with a Lebanese), many speakers code-switch back and forth between the dialectal and standard varieties of the language, sometimes even within the same sentence. Arabic speakers often improve their familiarity with other dialects via music or film.

The issue of whether Arabic is one language or many languages is politically charged, in the same way it is for the varieties of Chinese, Hindi and Urdu, Serbian and Croatian, Scots and English, etc. In contrast to speakers of Hindi and Urdu who claim they cannot understand each other even when they can, speakers of the varieties of Arabic will claim they can all understand each other even when they cannot. While there is a minimum level of comprehension between all Arabic dialects, this level can increase or decrease based on geographic proximity: for example, Levantine and Gulf speakers understand each other much better than they do speakers from the Maghreb. The issue of diglossia between spoken and written language is a significant complicating factor: A single written form, significantly different from any of the spoken varieties learned natively, unites a number of sometimes divergent spoken forms. For political reasons, Arabs mostly assert that they all speak a single language, despite significant issues of mutual incomprehensibility among differing spoken versions.

From a linguistic standpoint, it is often said that the various spoken varieties of Arabic differ among each other collectively about as much as the Romance languages. This is an apt comparison in a number of ways. The period of divergence from a single spoken form is similar—perhaps 1500 years for Arabic, 2000 years for the Romance languages. Also, while it is comprehensible to people from the Maghreb, a linguistically innovative variety such as Moroccan Arabic is essentially incomprehensible to Arabs from the Mashriq, much as French is incomprehensible to Spanish or Italian speakers but relatively easily learned by them. This suggests that the spoken varieties may linguistically be considered separate languages.

Status in the Arab world vis-à-vis other languages 
With the sole example of Medieval linguist Abu Hayyan al-Gharnati – who, while a scholar of the Arabic language, was not ethnically Arab – Medieval scholars of the Arabic language made no efforts at studying comparative linguistics, considering all other languages inferior.

In modern times, the educated upper classes in the Arab world have taken a nearly opposite view. Yasir Suleiman wrote in 2011 that "studying and knowing English or French in most of the Middle East and North Africa have become a badge of sophistication and modernity and ... feigning, or asserting, weakness or lack of facility in Arabic is sometimes paraded as a sign of status, class, and perversely, even education through a mélange of code-switching practises."

As a foreign language 
Arabic has been taught worldwide in many elementary and secondary schools, especially Muslim schools. Universities around the world have classes that teach Arabic as part of their foreign languages, Middle Eastern studies, and religious studies courses. Arabic language schools exist to assist students to learn Arabic outside the academic world. There are many Arabic language schools in the Arab world and other Muslim countries. Because the Quran is written in Arabic and all Islamic terms are in Arabic, millions of Muslims (both Arab and non-Arab) study the language. Software and books with tapes are also important part of Arabic learning, as many of Arabic learners may live in places where there are no academic or Arabic language school classes available. Radio series of Arabic language classes are also provided from some radio stations. A number of websites on the Internet provide online classes for all levels as a means of distance education; most teach Modern Standard Arabic, but some teach regional varieties from numerous countries.

Vocabulary

Loanwords 
The most important sources of borrowings into (pre-Islamic) Arabic are from the related (Semitic) languages Aramaic, which used to be the principal, international language of communication throughout the ancient Near and Middle East, and Ethiopic. In addition, many cultural, religious and political terms have entered Arabic from Iranian languages, notably Middle Persian, Parthian, and (Classical) Persian, and Hellenistic Greek (kīmiyāʼ has as origin the Greek khymia, meaning in that language the melting of metals; see Roger Dachez, Histoire de la Médecine de l'Antiquité au XXe siècle, Tallandier, 2008, p. 251), alembic (distiller) from ambix (cup), almanac (climate) from almenichiakon (calendar). (For the origin of the last three borrowed words, see Alfred-Louis de Prémare, Foundations of Islam, Seuil, L'Univers Historique, 2002.) Some Arabic borrowings from Semitic or Persian languages are, as presented in De Prémare's above-cited book: 
madīnah/medina (مدينة, city or city square), a word of Aramaic origin ܡܕ݂ܝܼܢ݇ܬܵܐ/"məḏī(n)ttā" (in which it means "state/city").
jazīrah (جزيرة), as in the well-known form الجزيرة "Al-Jazeera," means "island" and has its origin in the Syriac ܓܵܙܲܪܬܵܐ gāzartā.
lāzaward (لازورد) is taken from Persian لاژورد lājvard, the name of a blue stone, lapis lazuli. This word was borrowed in several European languages to mean (light) blue – azure in English, azur in French and azul in Portuguese and Spanish.

A comprehensive overview of the influence of other languages on Arabic is found in Lucas & Manfredi (2020).

Influence of Arabic on other languages 
The influence of Arabic has been most important in Islamic countries, because it is the language of the Islamic sacred book, the Quran. Arabic is also an important source of vocabulary for languages such as Amharic, Azerbaijani, Baluchi, Bengali, Berber, Bosnian, Chaldean, Chechen, Chittagonian, Croatian, Dagestani, Dhivehi, English, German, Gujarati, Hausa, Hindi, Kazakh, Kurdish, Kutchi, Kyrgyz, Malay (Malaysian and Indonesian), Pashto, Persian, Punjabi, Rohingya, Romance languages (French, Catalan, Italian, Portuguese, Sicilian, Spanish, etc.) Saraiki, Sindhi, Somali, Sylheti, Swahili, Tagalog, Tigrinya, Turkish, Turkmen, Urdu, Uyghur, Uzbek, Visayan and Wolof, as well as other languages in countries where these languages are spoken. Modern Hebrew has been also influenced by Arabic especially during the process of revival, as MSA was used as a source for modern Hebrew vocabulary and roots.

In addition, English has many Arabic loanwords, some directly, but most via other Mediterranean languages. Examples of such words include admiral, adobe, alchemy, alcohol, algebra, algorithm, alkaline, almanac, amber, arsenal, assassin, candy, carat, cipher, coffee, cotton, ghoul, hazard, jar, kismet, lemon, loofah, magazine, mattress, sherbet, sofa, sumac, tariff, and zenith. Other languages such as Maltese and Kinubi derive ultimately from Arabic, rather than merely borrowing vocabulary or grammatical rules.

Terms borrowed range from religious terminology (like Berber taẓallit, "prayer", from salat), academic terms (like Uyghur mentiq, "logic"), and economic items (like English coffee) to placeholders (like Spanish fulano, "so-and-so"), everyday terms (like Hindustani lekin, "but", or Spanish taza and French tasse, meaning "cup"), and expressions (like Catalan a betzef, "galore, in quantity"). Most Berber varieties (such as Kabyle), along with Swahili, borrow some numbers from Arabic.

In languages not directly in contact with the Arab world, Arabic loanwords are often transferred indirectly via other languages rather than being transferred directly from Arabic. For example, most Arabic loanwords in Hindustani and Turkish entered through Persian. Older Arabic loanwords in Hausa were borrowed from Kanuri. Most Arabic loanwords in Yoruba entered through Hausa.

Arabic words also made their way into several West African languages as Islam spread across the Sahara. Variants of Arabic words such as  kitāb ("book") have spread to the languages of African groups who had no direct contact with Arab traders.

Since, throughout the Islamic world, Arabic occupied a position similar to that of Latin in Europe, many of the Arabic concepts in the fields of science, philosophy, commerce, etc. were coined from Arabic roots by non-native Arabic speakers, notably by Aramaic and Persian translators, and then found their way into other languages. This process of using Arabic roots, especially in Kurdish and Persian, to translate foreign concepts continued through to the 18th and 19th centuries, when swaths of Arab-inhabited lands were under Ottoman rule.

Spoken varieties 

Colloquial Arabic is a collective term for the spoken dialects of Arabic used throughout the Arab world, which differ radically from the literary language. The main dialectal division is between the varieties within and outside of the Arabian peninsula, followed by that between sedentary varieties and the much more conservative Bedouin varieties. All the varieties outside of the Arabian peninsula (which include the large majority of speakers) have many features in common with each other that are not found in Classical Arabic. This has led researchers to postulate the existence of a prestige koine dialect in the one or two centuries immediately following the Arab conquest, whose features eventually spread to all newly conquered areas. These features are present to varying degrees inside the Arabian peninsula. Generally, the Arabian peninsula varieties have much more diversity than the non-peninsula varieties, but these have been understudied.

Within the non-peninsula varieties, the largest difference is between the non-Egyptian North African dialects (especially Moroccan Arabic) and the others. Moroccan Arabic in particular is hardly comprehensible to Arabic speakers east of Libya (although the converse is not true, in part due to the popularity of Egyptian films and other media).

One factor in the differentiation of the dialects is influence from the languages previously spoken in the areas, which have typically provided a significant number of new words and have sometimes also influenced pronunciation or word order; however, a much more significant factor for most dialects is, as among Romance languages, retention (or change of meaning) of different classical forms. Thus Iraqi aku, Levantine fīh and North African kayən all mean 'there is', and all come from Classical Arabic forms (yakūn, fīhi, kā'in respectively), but now sound very different.

Koiné 
According to Charles A. Ferguson, the following are some of the characteristic features of the koiné that underlies all the modern dialects outside the Arabian peninsula. Although many other features are common to most or all of these varieties, Ferguson believes that these features in particular are unlikely to have evolved independently more than once or twice and together suggest the existence of the koine:
 Loss of the dual number except on nouns, with consistent plural agreement (cf. feminine singular agreement in plural inanimates).
 Change of a to i in many affixes (e.g., non-past-tense prefixes ti- yi- ni-; wi- 'and'; il- 'the'; feminine -it in the construct state).
 Loss of third-weak verbs ending in w (which merge with verbs ending in y).
 Reformation of geminate verbs, e.g.,  'I untied' → .
 Conversion of separate words lī 'to me', laka 'to you', etc. into indirect-object clitic suffixes.
 Certain changes in the cardinal number system, e.g.,  'five days' → , where certain words have a special plural with prefixed t.
 Loss of the feminine elative (comparative).
 Adjective plurals of the form  'big' → .
 Change of nisba suffix  > .
 Certain lexical items, e.g.,  'bring' <  'come with';  'see';  'what' (or similar) <  'which thing';  (relative pronoun).

Dialect groups 
 Egyptian Arabic is spoken by 67 million people in Egypt. It is one of the most understood varieties of Arabic, due in large part to the widespread distribution of Egyptian films and television shows throughout the Arabic-speaking world
 Levantine Arabic is spoken by about 44 million people in Lebanon, Syria, Jordan, Palestine, Israel, and Turkey.
 Lebanese Arabic is a variety of Levantine Arabic spoken primarily in Lebanon.
 Jordanian Arabic is a continuum of mutually intelligible varieties of Levantine Arabic spoken by the population of the Kingdom of Jordan.
 Palestinian Arabic is a name of several dialects of the subgroup of Levantine Arabic spoken by the Palestinians in Palestine, by Arab citizens of Israel and in most Palestinian populations around the world.
 Samaritan Arabic, spoken by only several hundred in the Nablus region
 Cypriot Maronite Arabic, spoken in Cyprus by around 9,800 people (2013 UNSD)
 Maghrebi Arabic, also called "Darija" spoken by about 70 million people in Morocco, Algeria, Tunisia and Libya. It also forms the basis of Maltese via the extinct Sicilian Arabic dialect. Maghrebi Arabic is very hard to understand for Arabic speakers from the Mashriq or Mesopotamia, the most comprehensible being Libyan Arabic and the most difficult Moroccan Arabic. The others such as Algerian Arabic can be considered in between the two in terms of difficulty.
 Libyan Arabic spoken in Libya and neighboring countries.
 Tunisian Arabic spoken in Tunisia and North-eastern Algeria
 Algerian Arabic spoken in Algeria
 Judeo-Algerian Arabic was spoken by Jews in Algeria until 1962
 Moroccan Arabic spoken in Morocco
 Hassaniya Arabic (3 million speakers), spoken in Mauritania, Western Sahara, some parts of the Azawad in northern Mali, southern Morocco and south-western Algeria.
 Andalusian Arabic, spoken in Spain until the 16th century.
 Siculo-Arabic (Sicilian Arabic), was spoken in Sicily and Malta between the end of the 9th century and the end of the 12th century and eventually evolved into the Maltese language.
 Maltese, spoken on the island of Malta, is the only fully separate standardized language to have originated from an Arabic dialect (the extinct Siculo-Arabic dialect), with independent literary norms. Maltese has evolved independently of Modern Standard Arabic and its varieties into a standardized language over the past 800 years in a gradual process of Latinisation. Maltese is therefore considered an exceptional descendant of Arabic that has no diglossic relationship with Standard Arabic or Classical Arabic. Maltese is also different from Arabic and other Semitic languages since its morphology has been deeply influenced by Romance languages, Italian and Sicilian. It is also the only Semitic language written in the Latin script. In terms of basic everyday language, speakers of Maltese are reported to be able to understand less than a third of what is said to them in Tunisian Arabic, which is related to Siculo-Arabic, whereas speakers of Tunisian are able to understand about 40% of what is said to them in Maltese. This asymmetric intelligibility is considerably lower than the mutual intelligibility found between Maghrebi Arabic dialects. Maltese has its own dialects, with urban varieties of Maltese being closer to Standard Maltese than rural varieties.
 Mesopotamian Arabic, spoken by about 41.2 million people in Iraq (where it is called "Aamiyah"), eastern Syria and southwestern Iran (Khuzestan) and in the southeastern of Turkey (in the eastern Mediterranean, Southeastern Anatolia Region)
North Mesopotamian Arabic is a spoken north of the Hamrin Mountains in Iraq, in western Iran, northern Syria, and in southeastern Turkey (in the eastern Mediterranean Region, Southeastern Anatolia Region, and southern Eastern Anatolia Region).
Judeo-Mesopotamian Arabic, also known as Iraqi Judeo Arabic and Yahudic, is a variety of Arabic spoken by Iraqi Jews of Mosul.
Baghdad Arabic is the Arabic dialect spoken in Baghdad, and the surrounding cities and it is a subvariety of Mesopotamian Arabic.
Baghdad Jewish Arabic is the dialect spoken by the Iraqi Jews of Baghdad.
South Mesopotamian Arabic (Basrawi dialect) is the dialect spoken in southern Iraq, such as Basra, Dhi Qar and Najaf.
Khuzestani Arabic is the dialect spoken in the Iranian province of Khuzestan. This dialect is a mix of Southern Mesopotamian Arabic and Gulf Arabic.
 Khorasani Arabic spoken in the Iranian province of Khorasan.
Kuwaiti Arabic is a Gulf Arabic dialect spoken in Kuwait.
 Sudanese Arabic is spoken by 17 million people in Sudan and some parts of southern Egypt. Sudanese Arabic is quite distinct from the dialect of its neighbor to the north; rather, the Sudanese have a dialect similar to the Hejazi dialect.
 Juba Arabic spoken in South Sudan and southern Sudan
 Gulf Arabic, spoken by around four million people, predominantly in Kuwait, Bahrain, some parts of Oman, eastern Saudi Arabia coastal areas and some parts of UAE and Qatar. Also spoken in Iran's Bushehr and Hormozgan provinces. Although Gulf Arabic is spoken in Qatar, most Qatari citizens speak Najdi Arabic (Bedawi).
 Omani Arabic, distinct from the Gulf Arabic of Eastern Arabia and Bahrain, spoken in Central Oman. With recent oil wealth and mobility has spread over other parts of the Sultanate.
 Hadhrami Arabic, spoken by around 8 million people, predominantly in Hadhramaut, and in parts of the Arabian Peninsula, South and Southeast Asia, and East Africa by Hadhrami descendants.
 Yemeni Arabic spoken in Yemen, and southern Saudi Arabia by 15 million people. Similar to Gulf Arabic.
 Najdi Arabic, spoken by around 10 million people, mainly spoken in Najd, central and northern Saudi Arabia. Most Qatari citizens speak Najdi Arabic (Bedawi).
 Hejazi Arabic (6 million speakers), spoken in Hejaz, western Saudi Arabia
 Saharan Arabic spoken in some parts of Algeria, Niger and Mali
 Baharna Arabic (600,000 speakers), spoken by Bahrani Shiʻah in Bahrain and Qatif, the dialect exhibits many big differences from Gulf Arabic. It is also spoken to a lesser extent in Oman.
 Judeo-Arabic dialects – these are the dialects spoken by the Jews that had lived or continue to live in the Arab World. As Jewish migration to Israel took hold, the language did not thrive and is now considered endangered. So-called Qəltu Arabic.
 Chadian Arabic, spoken in Chad, Sudan, some parts of South Sudan, Central African Republic, Niger, Nigeria, Cameroon
 Central Asian Arabic, spoken in Uzbekistan, Tajikistan and Afghanistan by around 8,000 people. Tajiki Arabic is highly endangered.
 Shirvani Arabic, spoken in Azerbaijan and Dagestan until the 1930s, now extinct.

Phonology

History 
Various other consonants have changed their sound too, but have remained distinct. An original voiceless alveolar lateral fricative  became . Its emphatic counterpart  was considered by Arabs to be the most unusual sound in Arabic (Hence the Classical Arabic's appellation   or "language of the "); for most modern dialects, it has become an emphatic stop  with loss of the laterality or with complete loss of any pharyngealization or velarization, . (The classical  pronunciation of pharyngealization  still occurs in the Mehri language, and the similar sound without velarization, exists in other Modern South Arabian languages.)

Other changes may also have happened. Classical Arabic pronunciation is not thoroughly recorded and different reconstructions of the sound system of Proto-Semitic propose different phonetic values. One example is the emphatic consonants, which are pharyngealized in modern pronunciations but may have been velarized in the eighth century and glottalized in Proto-Semitic.

Early Akkadian transcriptions of Arabic names shows that this reduction had not yet occurred as of the early part of the 1st millennium BC.

The Classical Arabic language as recorded was a poetic koine that reflected a consciously archaizing dialect, chosen based on the tribes of the western part of the Arabian Peninsula, who spoke the most conservative variants of Arabic. Even at the time of Muhammed and before, other dialects existed with many more changes, including the loss of most glottal stops, the loss of case endings, the reduction of the diphthongs  and  into monophthongs , etc. Most of these changes are present in most or all modern varieties of Arabic.

An interesting feature of the writing system of the Quran (and hence of Classical Arabic) is that it contains certain features of Muhammad's native dialect of Mecca, corrected through diacritics into the forms of standard Classical Arabic. Among these features visible under the corrections are the loss of the glottal stop and a differing development of the reduction of certain final sequences containing : Evidently, final  became  as in the Classical language, but final  became a different sound, possibly  (rather than again  in the Classical language). This is the apparent source of the alif maqṣūrah 'restricted alif' where a final  is reconstructed: a letter that would normally indicate  or some similar high-vowel sound, but is taken in this context to be a logical variant of alif and represent the sound .

Literary Arabic 

The "colloquial" spoken dialects of Arabic are learned at home and constitute the native languages of Arabic speakers. "Formal" Modern Standard Arabic is learned at school; although many speakers have a native-like command of the language, it is technically not the native language of any speakers. Both varieties can be both written and spoken, although the colloquial varieties are rarely written down and the formal variety is spoken mostly in formal circumstances, e.g., in radio and TV broadcasts, formal lectures, parliamentary discussions and to some extent between speakers of different colloquial dialects. Even when the literary language is spoken, however, it is normally only spoken in its pure form when reading a prepared text out loud and communication between speakers of different colloquial dialects. When speaking extemporaneously (i.e. making up the language on the spot, as in a normal discussion among people), speakers tend to deviate somewhat from the strict literary language in the direction of the colloquial varieties. In fact, there is a continuous range of "in-between" spoken varieties: from nearly pure Modern Standard Arabic (MSA), to a form that still uses MSA grammar and vocabulary but with significant colloquial influence, to a form of the colloquial language that imports a number of words and grammatical constructions in MSA, to a form that is close to pure colloquial but with the "rough edges" (the most noticeably "vulgar" or non-Classical aspects) smoothed out, to pure colloquial. The particular variant (or register) used depends on the social class and education level of the speakers involved and the level of formality of the speech situation. Often it will vary within a single encounter, e.g., moving from nearly pure MSA to a more mixed language in the process of a radio interview, as the interviewee becomes more comfortable with the interviewer. This type of variation is characteristic of the diglossia that exists throughout the Arabic-speaking world.

Although Modern Standard Arabic (MSA) is a unitary language, its pronunciation varies somewhat from country to country and from region to region within a country. The variation in individual "accents" of MSA speakers tends to mirror corresponding variations in the colloquial speech of the speakers in question, but with the distinguishing characteristics moderated somewhat. It is important in descriptions of "Arabic" phonology to distinguish between pronunciation of a given colloquial (spoken) dialect and the pronunciation of MSA by these same speakers. Although they are related, they are not the same. For example, the phoneme that derives from Classical Arabic  has many different pronunciations in the modern spoken varieties, e.g.,  including the proposed original . Speakers whose native variety has either  or  will use the same pronunciation when speaking MSA. Even speakers from Cairo, whose native Egyptian Arabic has , normally use  when speaking MSA. The  of Persian Gulf speakers is the only variant pronunciation which isn't found in MSA;  is used instead, but may use [j] in MSA for comfortable pronunciation. Another reason of different pronunciations is influence of colloquial dialects. The differentiation of pronunciation of colloquial dialects is the influence from other languages previously spoken and some still presently spoken in the regions, such as Coptic in Egypt, Berber, Punic, or Phoenician in North Africa, Himyaritic, Modern South Arabian, and Old South Arabian in Yemen and Oman, and Aramaic and Canaanite languages (including Phoenician) in the Levant and Mesopotamia.

In many spoken varieties, the backed or "emphatic" vowel allophones spread a fair distance in both directions from the triggering consonant; in some varieties (most notably Egyptian Arabic), the "emphatic" allophones spread throughout the entire word, usually including prefixes and suffixes, even at a distance of several syllables from the triggering consonant. Speakers of colloquial varieties with this vowel harmony tend to introduce it into their MSA pronunciation as well, but usually with a lesser degree of spreading than in the colloquial varieties. (For example, speakers of colloquial varieties with extremely long-distance harmony may allow a moderate, but not extreme, amount of spreading of the harmonic allophones in their MSA speech, while speakers of colloquial varieties with moderate-distance harmony may only harmonize immediately adjacent vowels in MSA.)

Vowels 
Modern Standard Arabic has six pure vowels (while most modern dialects have eight pure vowels which includes the long vowels ), with short  and corresponding long vowels .

The pronunciation of the vowels differs from speaker to speaker, in a way that tends to reflect the pronunciation of the corresponding colloquial variety. Nonetheless, there are some common trends. Some accents and dialects, such as those of the Hejaz region, have an open  or a central  in all situations. The vowel  varies towards  too. The point is, Arabic has only three short vowel phonemes, so those phonemes can have a very wide range of allophones.

The definition of both "emphatic" and "neighborhood" vary in ways that reflect (to some extent) corresponding variations in the spoken dialects. Frequently, the  fricatives  also trigger emphatic allophones; occasionally also the pharyngeal consonants  (the former more than the latter). Many dialects have multiple emphatic allophones of each vowel, depending on the particular nearby consonants. In most MSA accents, emphatic coloring of vowels is limited to vowels immediately adjacent to a triggering consonant, although in some it spreads a bit farther: e.g.,    'time';    'homeland';    'downtown' (also  or similar).

In a non-emphatic environment, the vowel  in the diphthong  is pronounced  or : hence    'sword' but    'summer'.

Consonants 

Generally this corresponds with the pronunciation in the colloquial dialects.

In many varieties,  are epiglottal  in Western Asia.

 is pronounced as velarized  in الله , the name of God, q.e. Allah, when the word follows a, ā, u or ū (after i or ī it is unvelarized:  bismi l–lāh ).

The emphatic consonant  was actually pronounced , or possibly —either way, a highly unusual sound. The medieval Arabs actually termed their language  'the language of the Ḍād' (the name of the letter used for this sound), since they thought the sound was unique to their language. (In fact, it also exists in a few other minority Semitic languages, e.g., Mehri.)

Arabic has consonants traditionally termed "emphatic" , which exhibit simultaneous pharyngealization  as well as varying degrees of velarization  (depending on the region), so they may be written with the "Velarized or pharyngealized" diacritic as: . This simultaneous articulation is described as "Retracted Tongue Root" by phonologists. In some transcription systems, emphasis is shown by capitalizing the letter, for example,  is written ; in others the letter is underlined or has a dot below it, for example, .

Vowels and consonants can be phonologically short or long. Long (geminate) consonants are normally written doubled in Latin transcription (i.e. bb, dd, etc.), reflecting the presence of the Arabic diacritic mark , which indicates doubled consonants. In actual pronunciation, doubled consonants are held twice as long as short consonants. This consonant lengthening is phonemically contrastive:   'he accepted' vs.   'he kissed'.

Syllable structure 
Arabic has two kinds of syllables: open syllables (CV) and (CVV)—and closed syllables (CVC), (CVVC) and (CVCC). The syllable types with two morae (units of time), i.e. CVC and CVV, are termed heavy syllables, while those with three morae, i.e. CVVC and CVCC, are superheavy syllables. Superheavy syllables in Classical Arabic occur in only two places: at the end of the sentence (due to pausal pronunciation) and in words such as   'hot',   'stuff, substance',   'they disputed with each other', where a long  occurs before two identical consonants (a former short vowel between the consonants has been lost). (In less formal pronunciations of Modern Standard Arabic, superheavy syllables are common at the end of words or before clitic suffixes such as  'us, our', due to the deletion of final short vowels.)

In surface pronunciation, every vowel must be preceded by a consonant (which may include the glottal stop ). There are no cases of hiatus within a word (where two vowels occur next to each other, without an intervening consonant). Some words do have an underlying vowel at the beginning, such as the definite article al- or words such as   'he bought',   'meeting'. When actually pronounced, one of three things happens:
 If the word occurs after another word ending in a consonant, there is a smooth transition from final consonant to initial vowel, e.g.,   'meeting' .
 If the word occurs after another word ending in a vowel, the initial vowel of the word is elided, e.g.,   'house of the director' .
 If the word occurs at the beginning of an utterance, a glottal stop  is added onto the beginning, e.g.,   'The house is ...' .

Stress 
Word stress is not phonemically contrastive in Standard Arabic. It bears a strong relationship to vowel length. The basic rules for Modern Standard Arabic are:
 A final vowel, long or short, may not be stressed.
 Only one of the last three syllables may be stressed.
 Given this restriction, the last heavy syllable (containing a long vowel or ending in a consonant) is stressed, if it is not the final syllable.
 If the final syllable is super heavy and closed (of the form CVVC or CVCC) it receives stress.
 If no syllable is heavy or super heavy, the first possible syllable (i.e. third from end) is stressed.
 As a special exception, in Form VII and VIII verb forms stress may not be on the first syllable, despite the above rules: Hence  'he subscribed' (whether or not the final short vowel is pronounced),  'he subscribes' (whether or not the final short vowel is pronounced),  'he should subscribe (juss.)'. Likewise Form VIII  'he bought',  'he buys'.

These rules may result in differently stressed syllables when final case endings are pronounced, vs. the normal situation where they are not pronounced, as in the above example of  'library' in full pronunciation, but  'library' in short pronunciation.

The restriction on final long vowels does not apply to the spoken dialects, where original final long vowels have been shortened and secondary final long vowels have arisen from loss of original final -hu/hi.

Some dialects have different stress rules. In the Cairo (Egyptian Arabic) dialect a heavy syllable may not carry stress more than two syllables from the end of a word, hence  'school',  'Cairo'. This also affects the way that Modern Standard Arabic is pronounced in Egypt. In the Arabic of Sanaa, stress is often retracted:  'two houses',  'their table',  'desks',  'sometimes',  'their school'. (In this dialect, only syllables with long vowels or diphthongs are considered heavy; in a two-syllable word, the final syllable can be stressed only if the preceding syllable is light; and in longer words, the final syllable cannot be stressed.)

Levels of pronunciation 
The final short vowels (e.g., the case endings -a -i -u and mood endings -u -a) are often not pronounced in this language, despite forming part of the formal paradigm of nouns and verbs. The following levels of pronunciation exist:

Full pronunciation with pausa 
This is the most formal level actually used in speech. All endings are pronounced as written, except at the end of an utterance, where the following changes occur:
 Final short vowels are not pronounced. (But possibly an exception is made for feminine plural -na and shortened vowels in the jussive/imperative of defective verbs, e.g., irmi! 'throw!'".)
 The entire indefinite noun endings -in and -un (with nunation) are left off. The ending -an is left off of nouns preceded by a tāʾ marbūṭah ة (i.e. the -t in the ending -at- that typically marks feminine nouns), but pronounced as -ā in other nouns (hence its writing in this fashion in the Arabic script).
 The tāʼ marbūṭah itself (typically of feminine nouns) is pronounced as h. (At least, this is the case in extremely formal pronunciation, e.g., some Quranic recitations. In practice, this h is usually omitted.)

Formal short pronunciation 
This is a formal level of pronunciation sometimes seen. It is somewhat like pronouncing all words as if they were in pausal position (with influence from the colloquial varieties). The following changes occur:
 Most final short vowels are not pronounced. However, the following short vowels are pronounced:
 feminine plural -na
 shortened vowels in the jussive/imperative of defective verbs, e.g., irmi! 'throw!'
 second-person singular feminine past-tense -ti and likewise anti 'you (fem. sg.)'
 sometimes, first-person singular past-tense -tu
 sometimes, second-person masculine past-tense -ta and likewise anta 'you (masc. sg.)'
 final -a in certain short words, e.g., laysa 'is not', sawfa (future-tense marker)
 The nunation endings -an -in -un are not pronounced. However, they are pronounced in adverbial accusative formations, e.g.,  تَقْرِيبًا 'almost, approximately',  عَادَةً 'usually'.
 The tāʾ marbūṭah ending ة is unpronounced, except in construct state nouns, where it sounds as t (and in adverbial accusative constructions, e.g.,  عَادَةً 'usually', where the entire -tan is pronounced).
 The masculine singular nisbah ending  is actually pronounced  and is unstressed (but plural and feminine singular forms, i.e. when followed by a suffix, still sound as ).
 Full endings (including case endings) occur when a clitic object or possessive suffix is added (e.g.,  'us/our').

Informal short pronunciation 
This is the pronunciation used by speakers of Modern Standard Arabic in extemporaneous speech, i.e. when producing new sentences rather than reading a prepared text. It is similar to formal short pronunciation except that the rules for dropping final vowels apply even when a clitic suffix is added. Basically, short-vowel case and mood endings are never pronounced and certain other changes occur that echo the corresponding colloquial pronunciations. Specifically:
 All the rules for formal short pronunciation apply, except as follows.
 The past tense singular endings written formally as -tu -ta -ti are pronounced -t -t -ti. But masculine  is pronounced in full.
 Unlike in formal short pronunciation, the rules for dropping or modifying final endings are also applied when a clitic object or possessive suffix is added (e.g.,  'us/our'). If this produces a sequence of three consonants, then one of the following happens, depending on the speaker's native colloquial variety:
 A short vowel (e.g., -i- or -ǝ-) is consistently added, either between the second and third or the first and second consonants.
 Or, a short vowel is added only if an otherwise unpronounceable sequence occurs, typically due to a violation of the sonority hierarchy (e.g., -rtn- is pronounced as a three-consonant cluster, but -trn- needs to be broken up).
 Or, a short vowel is never added, but consonants like r l m n occurring between two other consonants will be pronounced as a syllabic consonant (as in the English words "butter bottle bottom button").
 When a doubled consonant occurs before another consonant (or finally), it is often shortened to a single consonant rather than a vowel added. (However, Moroccan Arabic never shortens doubled consonants or inserts short vowels to break up clusters, instead tolerating arbitrary-length series of arbitrary consonants and hence Moroccan Arabic speakers are likely to follow the same rules in their pronunciation of Modern Standard Arabic.)
 The clitic suffixes themselves tend also to be changed, in a way that avoids many possible occurrences of three-consonant clusters. In particular, -ka -ki -hu generally sound as -ak -ik -uh.
 Final long vowels are often shortened, merging with any short vowels that remain.
 Depending on the level of formality, the speaker's education level, etc., various grammatical changes may occur in ways that echo the colloquial variants:
 Any remaining case endings (e.g. masculine plural nominative -ūn vs. oblique -īn) will be leveled, with the oblique form used everywhere. (However, in words like  'father' and  'brother' with special long-vowel case endings in the construct state, the nominative is used everywhere, hence  'father of',  'brother of'.)
 Feminine plural endings in verbs and clitic suffixes will often drop out, with the masculine plural endings used instead. If the speaker's native variety has feminine plural endings, they may be preserved, but will often be modified in the direction of the forms used in the speaker's native variety, e.g. -an instead of -na.
 Dual endings will often drop out except on nouns and then used only for emphasis (similar to their use in the colloquial varieties); elsewhere, the plural endings are used (or feminine singular, if appropriate).

Colloquial varieties

Vowels

As mentioned above, many spoken dialects have a process of emphasis spreading, where the "emphasis" (pharyngealization) of emphatic consonants spreads forward and back through adjacent syllables, pharyngealizing all nearby consonants and triggering the back allophone  in all nearby low vowels. The extent of emphasis spreading varies.

Unstressed short vowels, especially , are deleted in many contexts. Many sporadic examples of short vowel change have occurred (especially → and interchange ↔). Most Levantine dialects merge short /i u/ into  in most contexts (all except directly before a single final consonant). In Moroccan Arabic, on the other hand, short  triggers labialization of nearby consonants (especially velar consonants and uvular consonants), and then short /a i u/ all merge into , which is deleted in many contexts. (The labialization plus  is sometimes interpreted as an underlying phoneme .) This essentially causes the wholesale loss of the short-long vowel distinction, with the original long vowels  remaining as half-long , phonemically , which are used to represent both short and long vowels in borrowings from Literary Arabic.

In most of the Moroccan, Algerian and Tunisian (except Sahel and Southeastern) Arabic dialects, they have subsequently merged into original .

Consonants
In most dialects, there may be more or fewer phonemes than those listed in the chart above. The usage of non-native   and   depends on the usage of each speaker but they might be more prevalent in some dialects than others.

Early in the expansion of Arabic, the separate emphatic phonemes  and  coalesced into a single phoneme . Many dialects (such as Egyptian, Levantine, and much of the Maghreb) subsequently lost  fricatives, converting  into .

Another key distinguishing mark of Arabic dialects is how they render the original velar and uvular plosives ,  (Proto-Semitic ), and :
   retains its original pronunciation in widely scattered regions such as Yemen, Morocco, and urban areas of the Maghreb. It is pronounced as a glottal stop  in several prestige dialects, such as those spoken in Cairo, Beirut and Damascus. But it is rendered as a voiced velar plosive  in Persian Gulf, Upper Egypt, parts of the Maghreb, and less urban parts of the Levant (e.g. Jordan). In Iraqi Arabic it sometimes retains its original pronunciation and is sometimes rendered as a voiced velar plosive, depending on the word. It is pronounced as a voiced uvular constrictive  in Sudanese Arabic. Many dialects with a modified pronunciation for  maintain the  pronunciation in certain words (often with religious or educational overtones) borrowed from the Classical language.
In Sana'a, Omani, and Bahrani  is pronounced .

Pharyngealization of the emphatic consonants tends to weaken in many of the spoken varieties, and to spread from emphatic consonants to nearby sounds. In addition, the "emphatic" allophone  automatically triggers pharyngealization of adjacent sounds in many dialects. As a result, it may be difficult or impossible to determine whether a given coronal consonant is phonemically emphatic or not, especially in dialects with long-distance emphasis spreading. (A notable exception is the sounds  vs.  in Moroccan Arabic, because the former is pronounced as an affricate  but the latter is not.)

Grammar

Literary Arabic 

As in other Semitic languages, Arabic has a complex and unusual morphology (i.e. method of constructing words from a basic root). Arabic has a nonconcatenative "root-and-pattern" morphology: A root consists of a set of bare consonants (usually three), which are fitted into a discontinuous pattern to form words. For example, the word for 'I wrote' is constructed by combining the root  'write' with the pattern  'I Xed' to form  'I wrote'. Other verbs meaning 'I Xed' will typically have the same pattern but with different consonants, e.g.  'I read',  'I ate',  'I went', although other patterns are possible (e.g.  'I drank',  'I said',  'I spoke', where the subpattern used to signal the past tense may change but the suffix  is always used).

From a single root , numerous words can be formed by applying different patterns:
   'I wrote'
   'I had (something) written'
   'I corresponded (with someone)'
   'I dictated'
   'I subscribed'
   'we corresponded with each other'
   'I write'
   'I have (something) written'
   'I correspond (with someone)'
   'I dictate'
   'I subscribe'
   'we correspond each other'
   'it was written'
   'it was dictated'
   'written'
   'dictated'
  'book'
   'books'
   'writer'
   'writers'
   'desk, office'
   'library, bookshop'
 etc.

Nouns and adjectives
Nouns in Literary Arabic have three grammatical cases (nominative, accusative, and genitive [also used when the noun is governed by a preposition]); three numbers (singular, dual and plural); two genders (masculine and feminine); and three "states" (indefinite, definite, and construct). The cases of singular nouns (other than those that end in long ā) are indicated by suffixed short vowels (/-u/ for nominative, /-a/ for accusative, /-i/ for genitive).

The feminine singular is often marked by  /-at/, which is pronounced as /-ah/ before a pause. Plural is indicated either through endings (the sound plural) or internal modification (the broken plural). Definite nouns include all proper nouns, all nouns in "construct state" and all nouns which are prefixed by the definite article  /al-/. Indefinite singular nouns (other than those that end in long ā) add a final /-n/ to the case-marking vowels, giving /-un/, /-an/ or /-in/ (which is also referred to as nunation or tanwīn).

Adjectives in Literary Arabic are marked for case, number, gender and state, as for nouns. However, the plural of all non-human nouns is always combined with a singular feminine adjective, which takes the  /-at/  suffix.

Pronouns in Literary Arabic are marked for person, number and gender. There are two varieties, independent pronouns and enclitics. Enclitic pronouns are attached to the end of a verb, noun or preposition and indicate verbal and prepositional objects or possession of nouns. The first-person singular pronoun has a different enclitic form used for verbs ( /-nī/) and for nouns or prepositions ( /-ī/ after consonants,  /-ya/ after vowels).

Nouns, verbs, pronouns and adjectives agree with each other in all respects. However, non-human plural nouns are grammatically considered to be feminine singular. Furthermore, a verb in a verb-initial sentence is marked as singular regardless of its semantic number when the subject of the verb is explicitly mentioned as a noun. Numerals between three and ten show "chiasmic" agreement, in that grammatically masculine numerals have feminine marking and vice versa.

Verbs

Verbs in Literary Arabic are marked for person (first, second, or third), gender, and number. They are conjugated in two major paradigms (past and non-past); two voices (active and passive); and six moods (indicative, imperative, subjunctive, jussive, shorter energetic and longer energetic), the fifth and sixth moods, the energetics, exist only in Classical Arabic but not in MSA. There are also two participles (active and passive) and a verbal noun, but no infinitive.

The past and non-past paradigms are sometimes also termed perfective and imperfective, indicating the fact that they actually represent a combination of tense and aspect. The moods other than the indicative occur only in the non-past, and the future tense is signaled by prefixing   or   onto the non-past. The past and non-past differ in the form of the stem (e.g., past   vs. non-past  ), and also use completely different sets of affixes for indicating person, number and gender: In the past, the person, number and gender are fused into a single suffixal morpheme, while in the non-past, a combination of prefixes (primarily encoding person) and suffixes (primarily encoding gender and number) are used. The passive voice uses the same person/number/gender affixes but changes the vowels of the stem.

The following shows a paradigm of a regular Arabic verb,   'to write'. In Modern Standard, the energetic mood (in either long or short form, which have the same meaning) is almost never used.

Derivation
Like other Semitic languages, and unlike most other languages, Arabic makes much more use of nonconcatenative morphology (applying many templates applied roots) to derive words than adding prefixes or suffixes to words.

For verbs, a given root can occur in many different derived verb stems (of which there are about fifteen), each with one or more characteristic meanings and each with its own templates for the past and non-past stems, active and passive participles, and verbal noun. These are referred to by Western scholars as "Form I", "Form II", and so on through "Form XV" (although Forms XI to XV are rare). These stems encode grammatical functions such as the causative, intensive and reflexive. Stems sharing the same root consonants represent separate verbs, albeit often semantically related, and each is the basis for its own conjugational paradigm. As a result, these derived stems are part of the system of derivational morphology, not part of the inflectional system.

Examples of the different verbs formed from the root   'write' (using   'red' for Form IX, which is limited to colors and physical defects):

Form II is sometimes used to create transitive denominative verbs (verbs built from nouns); Form V is the equivalent used for intransitive denominatives.

The associated participles and verbal nouns of a verb are the primary means of forming new lexical nouns in Arabic. This is similar to the process by which, for example, the English gerund "meeting" (similar to a verbal noun) has turned into a noun referring to a particular type of social, often work-related event where people gather together to have a "discussion" (another lexicalized verbal noun). Another fairly common means of forming nouns is through one of a limited number of patterns that can be applied directly to roots, such as the "nouns of location" in ma- (e.g.  'desk, office' <  'write',  'kitchen' <  'cook').

The only three genuine suffixes are as follows:
 The feminine suffix -ah; variously derives terms for women from related terms for men, or more generally terms along the same lines as the corresponding masculine, e.g.
 The nisbah suffix -iyy-. This suffix is extremely productive, and forms adjectives meaning "related to X". It corresponds to English adjectives in -ic, -al, -an, -y, -ist, etc.
 The feminine nisbah suffix -iyyah. This is formed by adding the feminine suffix -ah onto nisba adjectives to form abstract nouns. For example, from the basic root  'share' can be derived the Form VIII verb  'to cooperate, participate', and in turn its verbal noun  'cooperation, participation' can be formed. This in turn can be made into a nisbah adjective  'socialist', from which an abstract noun  'socialism' can be derived. Other recent formations are  'republic' (lit. "public-ness", <  'multitude, general public'), and the Gaddafi-specific variation  'people's republic' (lit.

Colloquial varieties 

The spoken dialects have lost the case distinctions and make only limited use of the dual (it occurs only on nouns and its use is no longer required in all circumstances). They have lost the mood distinctions other than imperative, but many have since gained new moods through the use of prefixes (most often /bi-/ for indicative vs. unmarked subjunctive). They have also mostly lost the indefinite "nunation" and the internal passive.

The following is an example of a regular verb paradigm in Egyptian Arabic.

Writing system  

The Arabic alphabet derives from the Aramaic through Nabatean, to which it bears a loose resemblance like that of Coptic or Cyrillic scripts to Greek script. Traditionally, there were several differences between the Western (North African) and Middle Eastern versions of the alphabet—in particular, the faʼ had a dot underneath and qaf a single dot above in the Maghreb, and the order of the letters was slightly different (at least when they were used as numerals).

However, the old Maghrebi variant has been abandoned except for calligraphic purposes in the Maghreb itself, and remains in use mainly in the Quranic schools (zaouias) of West Africa. Arabic, like all other Semitic languages (except for the Latin-written Maltese, and the languages with the Ge'ez script), is written from right to left. There are several styles of scripts such as thuluth, muhaqqaq, tawqi, rayhan, and notably naskh, which is used in print and by computers, and ruqʻah, which is commonly used for correspondence.

Originally Arabic was made up of only rasm without diacritical marks Later diacritical points (which in Arabic are referred to as nuqaṯ) were added (which allowed readers to distinguish between letters such as b, t, th, n and y). Finally signs known as Tashkil were used for short vowels known as harakat and other uses such as final postnasalized or long vowels.

Calligraphy 

After Khalil ibn Ahmad al Farahidi finally fixed the Arabic script around 786, many styles were developed, both for the writing down of the Quran and other books, and for inscriptions on monuments as decoration.

Arabic calligraphy has not fallen out of use as calligraphy has in the Western world, and is still considered by Arabs as a major art form; calligraphers are held in great esteem. Being cursive by nature, unlike the Latin script, Arabic script is used to write down a verse of the Quran, a hadith, or a proverb. The composition is often abstract, but sometimes the writing is shaped into an actual form such as that of an animal. One of the current masters of the genre is Hassan Massoudy.

In modern times the intrinsically calligraphic nature of the written Arabic form is haunted by the thought that a typographic approach to the language, necessary for digitized unification, will not always accurately maintain meanings conveyed through calligraphy.

Romanization 

There are a number of different standards for the romanization of Arabic, i.e. methods of accurately and efficiently representing Arabic with the Latin script. There are various conflicting motivations involved, which leads to multiple systems. Some are interested in transliteration, i.e. representing the spelling of Arabic, while others focus on transcription, i.e. representing the pronunciation of Arabic. (They differ in that, for example, the same letter  is used to represent both a consonant, as in "you" or "yet", and a vowel, as in "me" or "eat".) Some systems, e.g. for scholarly use, are intended to accurately and unambiguously represent the phonemes of Arabic, generally making the phonetics more explicit than the original word in the Arabic script. These systems are heavily reliant on diacritical marks such as "š" for the sound equivalently written sh in English. Other systems (e.g. the Bahá'í orthography) are intended to help readers who are neither Arabic speakers nor linguists with intuitive pronunciation of Arabic names and phrases. These less "scientific" systems tend to avoid diacritics and use digraphs (like sh and kh). These are usually simpler to read, but sacrifice the definiteness of the scientific systems, and may lead to ambiguities, e.g. whether to interpret sh as a single sound, as in gash, or a combination of two sounds, as in gashouse. The ALA-LC romanization solves this problem by separating the two sounds with a prime symbol ( ′ ); e.g., as′hal 'easier'.

During the last few decades and especially since the 1990s, Western-invented text communication technologies have become prevalent in the Arab world, such as personal computers, the World Wide Web, email, bulletin board systems, IRC, instant messaging and mobile phone text messaging. Most of these technologies originally had the ability to communicate using the Latin script only, and some of them still do not have the Arabic script as an optional feature. As a result, Arabic speaking users communicated in these technologies by transliterating the Arabic text using the Latin script, sometimes known as IM Arabic.

To handle those Arabic letters that cannot be accurately represented using the Latin script, numerals and other characters were appropriated. For example, the numeral "3" may be used to represent the Arabic letter . There is no universal name for this type of transliteration, but some have named it Arabic Chat Alphabet. Other systems of transliteration exist, such as using dots or capitalization to represent the "emphatic" counterparts of certain consonants. For instance, using capitalization, the letter , may be represented by d. Its emphatic counterpart, may be written as D.

Numerals 
In most of present-day North Africa, the Western Arabic numerals (0, 1, 2, 3, 4, 5, 6, 7, 8, 9) are used. However, in Egypt and Arabic-speaking countries to the east of it, the Eastern Arabic numerals ( –  –  –  –  –  –  –  –  – ) are in use. When representing a number in Arabic, the lowest-valued position is placed on the right, so the order of positions is the same as in left-to-right scripts. Sequences of digits such as telephone numbers are read from left to right, but numbers are spoken in the traditional Arabic fashion, with units and tens reversed from the modern English usage. For example, 24 is said "four and twenty" just like in the German language (vierundzwanzig) and Classical Hebrew, and 1975 is said "a thousand and nine-hundred and five and seventy" or, more eloquently, "a thousand and nine-hundred five seventy".

Arabic alphabet and nationalism 
There have been many instances of national movements to convert Arabic script into Latin script or to Romanize the language. Currently, the only Arabic variety to use Latin script is Maltese.

Lebanon
The Beirut newspaper La Syrie pushed for the change from Arabic script to Latin letters in 1922. The major head of this movement was Louis Massignon, a French Orientalist, who brought his concern before the Arabic Language Academy in Damascus in 1928. Massignon's attempt at Romanization failed as the academy and population viewed the proposal as an attempt from the Western world to take over their country. Sa'id Afghani, a member of the academy, mentioned that the movement to Romanize the script was a Zionist plan to dominate Lebanon. Said Akl created a Latin-based alphabet for Lebanese and used it in a newspaper he founded, Lebnaan, as well as in some books he wrote.

Egypt
After the period of colonialism in Egypt, Egyptians were looking for a way to reclaim and re-emphasize Egyptian culture. As a result, some Egyptians pushed for an Egyptianization of the Arabic language in which the formal Arabic and the colloquial Arabic would be combined into one language and the Latin alphabet would be used. There was also the idea of finding a way to use Hieroglyphics instead of the Latin alphabet, but this was seen as too complicated to use. A scholar, Salama Musa agreed with the idea of applying a Latin alphabet to Arabic, as he believed that would allow Egypt to have a closer relationship with the West. He also believed that Latin script was key to the success of Egypt as it would allow for more advances in science and technology. This change in alphabet, he believed, would solve the problems inherent with Arabic, such as a lack of written vowels and difficulties writing foreign words that made it difficult for non-native speakers to learn. Ahmad Lutfi As Sayid and Muhammad Azmi, two Egyptian intellectuals, agreed with Musa and supported the push for Romanization. The idea that Romanization was necessary for modernization and growth in Egypt continued with Abd Al-Aziz Fahmi in 1944. He was the chairman for the Writing and Grammar Committee for the Arabic Language Academy of Cairo. However, this effort failed as the Egyptian people felt a strong cultural tie to the Arabic alphabet. In particular, the older Egyptian generations believed that the Arabic alphabet had strong connections to Arab values and history, due to the long history of the Arabic alphabet (Shrivtiel, 189) in Muslim societies.

See also 

 Arabic Ontology
 Arabic diglossia
 Arabic influence on the Spanish language
Arabic Language International Council
 Arabic literature
 Arabic–English Lexicon
 Arabist
 Dictionary of Modern Written Arabic
 Glossary of Islam
 International Association of Arabic Dialectology
 List of Arab newspapers
 List of Arabic-language television channels
 List of Arabic given names
 List of arabophones
 List of countries where Arabic is an official language
 List of French words of Arabic origin
 List of replaced loanwords in Turkish

Notes

References

Citations

Sources 

 
 
 
 
 
 
 
 
 
 
 
 
 
 
 
 
 
 
 
 Suileman, Yasir. Arabic, Self and Identity: A Study in Conflict and Displacement. Oxford University Press, 2011. .

External links 

 
Languages attested from the 9th century BC
Articles containing video clips
Central Semitic languages
Fusional languages
Languages of Algeria
Languages of Bahrain
Languages of Cameroon
Languages of Chad
Languages of the Comoros
Languages of Djibouti
Languages of Eritrea
Languages of Gibraltar
Languages of Israel
Languages of Iran
Languages of Iraq
Languages of Jordan
Languages of Kurdistan
Languages of Kuwait
Languages of Lebanon
Languages of Libya
Languages of Mali
Languages of Mauritania
Languages of Morocco
Languages of Niger
Languages of Oman
Languages of the State of Palestine
Languages of Qatar
Languages of Saudi Arabia
Languages of Senegal
Languages of South Sudan
Languages of Sicily
Languages of Somalia
Languages of Sudan
Languages of Syria
Languages of the United Arab Emirates
Languages of Tunisia
Languages of Yemen
Languages with own distinct writing systems
Lingua francas
Stress-timed languages
Subject–verb–object languages
Verb–subject–object languages